Kamilla Bartone and Oksana Selekhmeteva won the girls' doubles tennis title at the 2019 US Open, defeating Aubane Droguet and Séléna Janicijevic in the final, 7–5, 7–6(8–6).

Cori Gauff and Caty McNally were the defending champions, but chose not to participate, having already competed in the women's doubles.

Seeds

Draw

Finals

Top half

Bottom half

External links 
 Main draw

Girls' Doubles
US Open, 2019 Girls' Doubles